Tizkharab or Tizkhar Ab may refer to:
 Tizkharab, Salmas
 Tizkharab, Urmia
 Tizkharab, Rowzeh Chay, Urmia County

See also
 Tez Kharab (disambiguation)